Statistics of 1. deild in the 1994 season.

Overview
It was contested by 10 teams, and GÍ Gøta won the championship.

League standings

Results
The schedule consisted of a total of 18 games. Each team played two games against every opponent in no particular order. One of the games was at home and one was away.

Top goalscorers
Source: faroesoccer.com

21 goals
 John Petersen (GÍ)

14 goals
 Gunnar Mohr (HB)

12 goals
 Eyðun Klakstein (KÍ)

10 goals
 Allan Mørkøre (KÍ)

9 goals
 Bogi Johannesen (TB)
 Kurt Mørkøre (KÍ)

8 goals
 Djóni Joensen (NSÍ)
 Sámal Joensen (GÍ)

1. deild seasons
Faroe
Faroe
1